Every year, Gujarat celebrates more than 200 festivals. The International Kite Festival (Uttarayan) is one of the biggest festivals celebrated. Months beforehand, homes in Gujarat begin to manufacture kites special box kites for the festival.  

The festival of Uttarayan marks the day when winter begins to turn into summer, according to the Indian calendar. It is the sign for farmers that the sun is back and that harvest season, Makara Sankranti/Mahasankranti, is approaching. This is considered one of the most important harvest days in India as it also marks the end of winter and the beginning of the harvest season. Many cities in Gujarat organize kite competitions among their citizens.

In this region of Gujarat and many other states, Uttarayan is such a huge celebration that it has become a public holiday in India lasting two days. During the festival, local food such as undhiyu (a mixed vegetable including yam and beans), chikki (sesame seed brittle) and jalebi are served to the crowds. Days before the festival, the market is filled with participants buying their supplies.

In 2012, the Tourism Corporation of Gujarat mentioned that the International Kite Festival in Gujarat was attempting to enter the Guinness World Records book due to the participation of 42 countries in it that year.

Location

The International Kite Festival, Uttarayan, is celebrated in many cities of Gujarat, Telangana and Rajasthan including Ahmedabad, Jaipur, Udaipur, Jodhpur, Surat, Vadodara, Rajkot, Hyderabad, Nadiad, and Dakor. However, the international kite event takes place in Ahmedabad (kite capital of Gujarat), which accommodates visitors from many nations.

The best place to enjoy this festival is the Sabarmati Riverfront (its Sabarmati river bank has a capacity of over 500,000 people) or the Ahmedabad Police Stadium, where people lie down to see the sky filled with thousands of kites.

During the festival week the markets are flooded with kite buyers and sellers. In the heart of Ahmedabad is one of the most famous kite markets, Patang Bazaar, which during the festive week is open 24 hours a day with buyers and sellers negotiating and buying in bulk.

Many families in Ahmadabad start making kites at home and set up small shops in their own homes.

There is a Kite Museum located at Sanskar Kendra in Paldi area of Ahmedabad. Established in 1985, it contains a collection of unique kites.

Other parts of India also celebrate the kite festival, in Delhi on 15 August and in most of Bihar's districts on 14 April. People offer prayers and eat sattu (made from new crop wheat) and new mangoes (baby mango, also known as Tikola).

Dates
The festival takes place on 14 January of each year during the Makar Sankranti and continues until 15 January. This date marks the end of winter and the return of more clement weather for farmers of the Gujarat region. These days have also become a public holiday within the Gujarat state of India so that everyone can take part in the celebration. 15 January is known as Vasi Uttarayan.

History
The symbolism of this festival is to show the awakening of the gods from their deep sleep. Through India's history, it is said that India created the tradition of kite flying due to the kings and royals, later followed by nawabs, who found the sport entertaining, and as a way to display their skills and power. Over time, as the sport became popular, it began to reach the masses. Kite flying has been a regional event in Gujarat for several years. However, the first international festival was celebrated in 1989 when people from all across the globe participated and showcased their innovative kites.

In the 2012 event, the International Kite Festival was inaugurated by Chief Minister Narendra Modi in the presence of Governor Kamla Beniwal.

Participants

The mention of this festival is in the Rigveda which dates back more than 5000 years. The day marks the beginning of the auspicious six-month period known as Uttarayana. Today, regardless of people's background or beliefs, they are welcome to fly kites with everyone else in Gujarat in January. Most visitors arrive from around India, from Gujarat itself or another state. In major cities of Gujarat, kite flying starts as early as 5 am and goes until late at night. Approximately 8-10 million people participate in the festival.

However, many visitors come from around the world, from countries including Japan, Italy, UK, Canada, Brazil, Indonesia, Australia, the US, Malaysia, Singapore, France, and China to take part in the celebration.

The festival has been strongly influenced by its international participants in recent events, for instance:

 Malaysia brought wau-balang kites.
 Indonesia brought llayang-llayanghave.
 The US brought giant banner kites.
 Japan brought Rokkaku fighting kites.
 Italy brought Italian sculptural kites.
 Chinese brought flying dragon kites.
 For other kites, see list of Kite types.

This festival is also an occasion for many public entities such as famous dancers, singers, actors, celebrities or politicians who make an appearance and entertain the population. In 2004, for example, the (Bollywood) actress Juhi Chawla was part of the celebration and performed a garba dance, which is very popular in India.

Types of kites

During the event, kite markets are set up alongside food stalls and performers. They are usually made with materials such as plastic, leaves, wood, metal, nylon and other scrap materials, but the ones for Uttarayan are made of light-weight paper and bamboo, and are mostly rhombus shaped with a central spine and a single bow. Dye and paint are also added to increase the glamour of the kite. The lines are covered with mixtures of glue and ground glass which, when dried, rolled up and attached to the rear, also known as firkees, become sharp enough to cut skin. These types of sharp lines are used on fighter kites, known in India as patangs, to cut down other kites during kite fighting events.

On the second night of the festival, illuminated kites filled with lights and candles known as tukals or tukkals are launched, creating a spectacle in the dark sky.

Other kite festivals 

Kites are a part of the culture in Asia, which is why most kite festivals take place there. Here are the most popular kite festivals of the world:

Japan Kite Festival in Uchinada, Ishikawa
China Kite Festival called Weifang International Kite Festival
Jakarta Kite Festival in Pangandaran
Washington D.C. International Kite Festival, formerly called Smithsonian Kite Festival, and now known as the Blossom Kite Festival
Indonesia Kite Festival in Bali island, Bali Kite Festival
United-Kingdom Kite Festival in Bristol city, Bristol International Kite Festival
Netherlands Kite Festival in Valkenswaard

References

Kite festivals
Festivals in Gujarat
January events
Sports festivals in India